Zoveng (Zoukhopi) is one of the oldest town ward within Lamka or Churachandpur district of Indian state of Manipur. This residential area is mostly located along S. Chinzagin Road and Zoveng-Kaivung Road along Bijang Loubuk Government School that branches off from Tedim road. The ward has a high concentration of ethnic Zou and mostly  Zou/Zo people communities.

The Zogal Memorial Hall is located in Zoveng. The Hall was constructed in memory of the Zogal also known as the Kuki Rising(1917–19) against the British in History. Presently Zoveng is also known as the Heart of Lamka.

Cities and towns in Churachandpur district
Geography of Manipur
Churachandpur